Anne Thongprasom (born 1 November 1976) is a Thai actress, model and producer who was the lead actress in many Thai series during the 2000s. She had the lead role in the 2004 romantic melodrama The Letter: Jod Mai Rak.

Early life 
Thongprasom is the daughter of a Thai mother and a Swedish father. She started her career when she was 13 years old, starring in a music video. She went on to star in many more films and television series. Her biggest role was in The Letter: Jod Mai Rak, which earned more than 50 million baht.

Education
 Bachelor of Communication of Arts from Bangkok University
 Master in Faculty of Journalism and Mass Communication from Thammasat University

Career 

Thongprasom came into the entertainment business after being invited to test in a music video by a friend of her mother who was working as a makeup designer for RS Promotion. She was 13 when she featured in her first music video.

Filmography

Films

Dramas

As producer

References

External links 
 For Thailand Web : Untitled Document

1976 births
Living people
Ann Thongprasom
Ann Thongprasom
Ann Thongprasom
Ann Thongprasom
Ann Thongprasom
Ann Thongprasom
Ann Thongprasom
Ann Thongprasom
Ann Thongprasom
Ann Thongprasom
Ann Thongprasom
Ann Thongprasom
Ann Thongprasom
Ann Thongprasom
Women television producers
Ann Thongprasom
Ann Thongprasom
Ann Thongprasom